Peace Breaks Out (1981) is a novel by American author John Knowles, better known for A Separate Peace (1959). Both books share the setting of the Devon preparatory school, probably a reference to Phillips Exeter Academy in Exeter, New Hampshire, which Knowles attended in his youth.

Plot
The book follows the story of Pete Hallam as he returns to the school and becomes a history teacher as well as a coach. It is a story of the aftermath of World War II and the loss of innocence of young men.

It starts by Pete Hallam returning, war-torn and emotionally scarred, to the school from which he graduated. He is now a teacher at Devon School and detects a subtle but deep hate between two members of the class in the first session alone.

Characters
Pete Hallam – the school teacher and main character. He is a veteran, having served in Italy during World War Two, and is also an alumnus of Devon. 
Wexford – a "defiant, scheming troublemaker" who stops at nothing to go through with his vengeful plans.
Eric Hochschwender – another student of Pete's American History class, of whom Wexford has a rivalry with. He often provokes and annoys him.
Rob Willis – Hochschwender's roommate.
Nick Blackburn – A lively, popular boy. 
Tug Blackburn – Nick's brother.
Cotty Donaldson – Tug's roommate.
Joan Hallam – Pete's ex-wife.

1981 American novels
Novels set in New Hampshire
Novels set in boarding schools